Waking and Dreaming is the fourth studio album by American pop rock band Orleans. It was released on August 1976 by Asylum Records. The album reached number 30 on Billboards Top LPs & Tape chart and spawned the singles "Still the One" (number five) and "Reach" (number 51).  

Cash Box said of "Reach" that it "exhibits harmonic similarities to ['Still the One'], substituting a funky beat for the shuffle."  Other reviewers found gospel music elements in "Reach."  Record World said that it has "an early Doobie Brothers-type sound."

Cash Box said of "Spring Fever" that "a saxophone gets it sizzling, and sinewey pop melodies and confident harmonies from this versatile collection of musicians keep it going." Record World said "With the snow melting, the temperature rising, and the days getting longer, it's time for spring fever. After coming off two successful chart records, the group is poised to herald in the season in fine style."

Track listing

Personnel
 John Hall – electric guitar  (1-4, 6, 7, 9, 10), lead vocals (1-5, 8, 9), backing vocals  (6, 7, 10) , acoustic guitar (5, 8), synthesizer (5)
 Larry Hoppen – electric piano (1, 5, 6, 10), backing vocals (1, 3, 5, 7, 9), lead vocals (2, 4, 6, 10), electric guitar (2, 4, 6, 7), organ (1, 3, 9), synthesizer (3), clavinet (10)
 Lance Hoppen – bass (all tracks), backing vocals (all but 8), synthesizer (8)
 Wells Kelly – drums (1, 2, 4, 7, 9, 10), backing vocals (1-4, 6, 9, 10), piano (3, 8), percussion (9), lead vocals (7), lead electric guitar (7), organ (4), tambourine (6)
 Jerry Marotta – drums (all but 5), percussion (5, 9), congas (1), backing vocals (10)
additional personnel
 Linda Ronstadt - backing vocals (3)
 Blue Mitchell - trumpet (8)
 Michael Brecker - saxophone (10)

Charts

References

1976 albums
Albums produced by Chuck Plotkin
Asylum Records albums
Orleans (band) albums